Paravicini is a surname. Notable people with the surname include:

Agostino Paravicini Bagliani (born 1943), Italian historian
Derek Paravicini (born 1979), English autistic savant known as a musical prodigy
Harry de Paravicini (1859–1942), English first-class cricketer
Ottavio Paravicini (1552–1611), Roman Catholic cardinal
Percy de Paravicini (1862–1921), English amateur cricketer and international footballer
Tim de Paravicini (1945-2020), English electronic engineer, designer and founder of EAR Yoshin